The Central District of Dehaqan County is a district (bakhsh) in Dehaqan County, Isfahan Province, Iran. At the 2006 census, its population was 34,149, in 9,550 families.  The District has one city: Dehaqan. The District has three rural districts (dehestan): Hamgin Rural District, Musaabad Rural District, and Qombovan Rural District.

References 

Dehaqan County
Districts of Isfahan Province